Cenophengus is a genus of glowworm beetles in the family Phengodidae. There are at least 30 described species in Cenophengus.

Species
 Cenophengus baios Zaragoza-Caballero, 2003
 Cenophengus brunneus Wittmer, 1976
 Cenophengus ciceroi Wittmer, 1981
Cenophengus cuicatlaensis Zaragoza-Caballero, 2008
 Cenophengus debilis LeConte, 1881
Cenophengus gardunoi Vega-Badillo, Morrone & Zaragoza-Caballero, 2021
Cenophengus gorhami Zaragoza-Callero, 1986
Cenophengus hnogamui Vega-Badillo, Zaragoza-Caballero & Ríos-Ibarra, 2021
Cenophengus howdeni Zaragoza-Caballero, 1986
Cenophengus huatulcoensis Zaragoza-Caballero, 2008
Cenophengus kikapu Vega-Badillo, Zaragoza-Caballero & Ríos-Ibarra, 2021
 Cenophengus longicollis Wittmer, 1976
 Cenophengus magnus Zaragoza-Caballero, 1988
 Cenophengus major Wittmer, 1976
 Cenophengus marmoratus Wittmer, 1976
Cenophengus mboi Vega-Badillo, Zaragoza-Caballero & Ríos-Ibarra, 2021
Cenophengus mumui Vega-Badillo, Zaragoza-Caballero & Ríos-Ibarra, 2021
Cenophengus munizi Zaragoza-Caballero, 2008
 Cenophengus niger Wittmer, 1986
 Cenophengus pallidus Schaeffer, 1904
 Cenophengus pedregalensis Zaragoza-Caballero, 1975
 Cenophengus punctatissimus Wittmer, 1976
Cenophengus saasil Vega-Badillo, Morrone & Zaragoza-Caballero, 2021
Cenophengus sonoraensis Zaragoza-Caballero, 2008
Cenophengus tsiik Vega-Badillo, Morrone & Zaragoza-Caballero, 2021
Cenophengus tupae Vega-Badillo, Zaragoza-Caballero & Ríos-Ibarra, 2021
 Cenophengus villae Zaragoza-Caballero, 1984
 Cenophengus wittmeri Zaragoza-Caballero, 1984
Cenophengus xiinbali Vega-Badillo, Zaragoza-Caballero & Ríos-Ibarra, 2021
Cenophengus zuritai Vega-Badillo, Morrone & Zaragoza-Caballero, 2021

References

 O'Keefe, Sean T. / Arnett, Ross H. Jr., Michael C. Thomas, Paul E. Skelley, and J. H. Frank, eds. (2002). "Family 61. Phengodidae LeConte, 1861". American Beetles, vol. 2: Polyphaga: Scarabaeoidea through Curculionoidea, 181–186.
 Wittmer, W. (1976). "Arbeiten zu einer Revision der Familie Phengodidae (Coleoptera)". Entomologischen Arbeiten aus dem Museum G. Frey, vol. 27, 415–524.
 Zaragoza Caballero, Santiago (1984). "Catálogo de la familia Phengodidae (Coleóptera)". Anales del Instituto de Biología, Universidad Nacional Autónoma de Mexico, Serie Zoología, vol. 55, no. 1, 307–324.

Further reading

 Arnett, R. H. Jr., M. C. Thomas, P. E. Skelley and J. H. Frank. (eds.). (21 June 2002). American Beetles, Volume II: Polyphaga: Scarabaeoidea through Curculionoidea. CRC Press LLC, Boca Raton, Florida .
 Arnett, Ross H. (2000). American Insects: A Handbook of the Insects of America North of Mexico. CRC Press.
 Richard E. White. (1983). Peterson Field Guides: Beetles. Houghton Mifflin Company.

External links

 NCBI Taxonomy Browser, Cenophengus

Phengodidae
Bioluminescent insects